Samachablo is a Georgian historical district in Shida Kartli, Georgia, which lies entirely within the disputed South Ossetia Region. The name Samachablo (literally, "of Machabeli") derives from the Georgian aristocratic family of Machabeli who once held possession of the area. With the rise of Georgian-Ossetian interethnic tensions in the late 1980s, the name was revived by the Georgians and has sometimes been semi-officially used since then.

This territory is referred to as Tskhinvali region by Georgian authorities after the name of its only city.

See also 
Georges V. Matchabelli
Ivane Machabeli

References 

Former provinces of Georgia (country)
Historical regions of Georgia (country)
Geography of South Ossetia